The 10th Central Committee of the Lao People's Revolutionary Party (LPRP) was elected at the 10th LPRP National Congress in 2016. It is composed of 69 members and 8 alternate members.

Members

Alternates

References

10th Central Committee of the Lao People's Revolutionary Party
2016 establishments in Laos
2021 disestablishments in Laos